The 2017–18 Algerian Women's Championship was the 20th season of the Algerian Women's Championship, the Algerian national women's association football competition.
FC Constantine won the competition after a close battle with AS Sureté Nationale in both the East Central Group and the Championship Round.

Results

Groups

Group East Central

Group West Central

Play Down

Play Down East Central

Play Down West Central

Championship Round

References

External links
2016–17 Algerian Women's Championship - goalzz.com

Algerian Women's Championship seasons